The Ruby Range is a subrange of the Valhalla Ranges of the Selkirk Mountains of the Columbia Mountains in southeastern British Columbia, Canada, located west of the northern end of Slocan Lake.

References

Ruby Range in the Canadian Mountain Encyclopedia

Selkirk Mountains